Ceratosoma palliolatum is a species of sea slug or dorid nudibranch, a marine gastropod mollusk in the family Chromodorididae.

Distribution 
This species was described from Darwin, Northern Territory, Australia.

Description

Ecology

References

Chromodorididae
Gastropods described in 1988